Jeff Genyk (born August 22, 1960) is an American football coach and former player. He is currently the special teams coordinator for Northwestern. Genyk served as the head football coach at Eastern Michigan University from 2004 to 2008, compiling a record of 16–42 in five seasons. He was a television analyst for Atlantic Coast Conference football for ESPN during the 2009 season.

Early career
Genyk was born in Ann Arbor, Michigan, and was raised in nearby Milan, Michigan. Jeff's father George Genyk played college football for the University of Michigan Wolverines, and served as a captain on the 1959 team. George was drafted by the New York Titans in the first tier of the 1960 American Football League draft.

Genyk graduated from Milan High School and went on to attend Bowling Green State University where he started at quarterback for the Falcons football team. He graduated in 1982 with a degree in Business Administration. He later earned a Master of Business Administration from Western Michigan University in 1989, and a master's in education from Northwestern University in 1994. During the interim, Genyk served as an assistant football coach at Grand Rapids Community College from 1990 to 1992. From 1994 to 2003, Genyk served as an assistant coach at Northwestern, at different times coaching linebackers, running backs, and the secondary. From 1998 to 2003 he served as special teams coordinator and recruiting coordinator. During his time at Northwestern, the Wildcats won three Big Ten Conference titles and participated in four bowl games.

Eastern Michigan
In 2004, Eastern Michigan hired Genyk to be their head coach. Prior to accepting the EMU head coaching position, Genyk spent the previous 12 years at Northwestern working for the football program. He was the running backs coach, recruiting coordinator and one of the special teams coaches for five seasons (1999–2003). In 1998 he was the secondary coach, working with the safeties, and he was also one of the special teams' coaches. In 1997, Genyk was the linebackers coach, and one of the special teams coaches as well. In December 1996, prior to the Wildcats' appearance in the Comp USA Florida Citrus Bowl, Genyk was elevated to inside linebackers coach. Before the 1997 season, he made the switch to outside linebackers coach. During the 1994, 1995 and 1996 seasons, he was the director of football operations. He first joined the Northwestern staff as a graduate assistant coach for the 1992 and 1993 seasons.

During his tenure as the running backs coach, Genyk tutored tailback Damien Anderson to a school-record 2,063 yards in the 2000 season. He also saw another one of his running backs, Jason Wright, reach the 1,000-yard rushing mark in both 2002 and 2003 with 1,234 and 1,151 yards respectively. Anderson went on to earn All-American honors in 2000 while Wright was an Academic All-American in 2002.

Genyk was part of three Big Ten championship teams, and four postseason bowl games at Northwestern. The 1995, 1996, and 2000 teams all won Big Ten titles. The 1995 squad played in the Rose Bowl, the 1996 team was in the Comp USA Florida Citrus Bowl, the 2000 team played in the Alamo Bowl, and the 2003 squad played in the Motor City Bowl. The '95 and '96 squads (as well as the 2000 squad in perhaps one of the greatest games in college football history) defeated Michigan, which Northwestern had not done since 1965.

Genyk joined the Northwestern football staff in 1992 after serving as an assistant coach at Grand Rapids (Mich.) Community College from December 1990 to the spring of 1992, where he tutored the quarterbacks and wide receivers. Prior to joining the coaching ranks, he worked in private business from 1982 to 1991.

In his first season, 2004, Genyk helped lead EMU to a 4-4 Mid-American Conference record, the best record since the 1999 squad went 4-4 in Mid-American Conference play, and a 4-7 overall record. In addition, Genyk directed the Eagles to the Michigan MAC championship with wins over both in-state league rivals, Western Michigan and Central Michigan, for the first time since the 1986 season.

The 2005 season, Jeff Genyk's second as head coach, saw limited improvement as the Eagles finished with a 4-7 overall record (the same as 2004) and a 3-5 MAC mark. However, that final record could just as easily have been 6-5, 7-4, or even 8-3, as the Eagles dropped two one-point games (Miami University, Ball State), one two-point game (at Cincinnati), and one eight-point game (Western Michigan).

In 2006, EMU had just one win, the homecoming game against Toledo. Once again, the total could have been a lot higher, with six losses coming only by one possession. They lost two games by 8 (at Northwestern, at Kent State), one game in overtime by 7 (Central Michigan), one game by 6 (Ohio), and two games by 3 (at Bowling Green, at Western Michigan).

In 2007, the Eagles finished third in the MAC West, their highest showing since 1997. This included wins over Western Michigan University and Central Michigan University, giving EMU the Michigan MAC Trophy.

After tallying a 3–9 record during the 2008 campaign and going 16–42 overall during his five years at the helm, Genyk was fired in November. He coached the season's final game against Central Michigan, a 56–52 upset in front of a home crowd in Ypsilanti.

After Eastern Michigan
During the 2009 season, Genyk served as a color commentator for ACC games on ESPN.

From 2010 to 2012, Genyk served as the special teams coordinator and tight ends coach at the University of California under head coach Jeff Tedford.

On January 23, 2013, Genyk was announced as the special teams coordinator and running backs coach at the University of Nevada, Reno under new head coach Brian Polian. Genyk served at Nevada for a little over a month before departing for the University of Wisconsin to serve as special teams coordinator and tight ends coach under head coach Gary Andersen.

For the 2015 season, Genyk rekindled a working relationship with Northwestern University, serving as a quality control coach and consulting head coach Pat Fitzgerald on special teams, offense and game management.

On January 21, 2016, Genyk was announced as the special teams coordinator and running backs coach at Vanderbilt University under head coach Derek Mason. After two sub-.500 seasons, the Vanderbilt parted ways with Genyk.

On February 9, 2018, it was announced that Genyk would again be rejoining the Northwestern coaching staff, this time as their special teams coordinator. In 2022 he added the responsibility of tight ends coach.

Head coaching record

References

External links
 Vanderbilt profile

1960 births
Living people
American football quarterbacks
College football announcers
Bowling Green Falcons football players
California Golden Bears football coaches
Eastern Michigan Eagles football coaches
Nevada Wolf Pack football coaches
Northwestern Wildcats football coaches
Vanderbilt Commodores football coaches
Wisconsin Badgers football coaches
Junior college football coaches in the United States
Western Michigan University alumni
Players of American football from Ann Arbor, Michigan
People from Milan, Michigan
Coaches of American football from Michigan